Goran Nava (Serbian Cyrillic: Горан Нава, born 15 April 1981) is a Serbian-Italian middle distance runner who competed for Serbia in track and field. Born in Castello di Brianza in Italy, he attended Radford University in Virginia, United States. He is a graduate student at the London School of Business (LSB). Nava competed in the 2008 Summer Olympics and was also named "Most Successful Athlete of the Year" by the Serbian Athletic Federation in 2009.

Running career

Collegiate
Nava represented Radford University at the 2004 NCAA Men's Division I Outdoor Track and Field Championships, where he ran the 1500 metres in 3:48.85 (min:sec). Nava holds multiple track records in various distances for Radford.

Post-collegiate
At the 2008 Summer Olympics, he represented Serbia in the 1500 metres, running a time of 3:42.92. At the 2009 Summer Universiade, he finished second overall in the 800 metres with a time of 1:48.06, only 0.04 seconds behind the first-place Sajjad Moradi. In the same competition he earned third place in the 1500 metres, at 3:42.88. Later in his career he began to race more often in the indoor 1500 metres, competing in the European Indoor Championships in 2011 and 2013.

Achievements

See also
 Serbian records in athletics

References

External links
 
 
 
 
  (archive)

1981 births
Living people
Italian expatriates in England
Italian expatriate sportspeople in the United States
Serbian expatriates in England
Serbian expatriate sportspeople in the United States
Serbian male middle-distance runners
Athletes (track and field) at the 2008 Summer Olympics
Olympic athletes of Serbia
Radford Highlanders
Sportspeople from the Province of Lecco
Sportspeople from Bologna
Italian male middle-distance runners
Universiade medalists in athletics (track and field)
Universiade silver medalists for Serbia
Universiade bronze medalists for Serbia
Medalists at the 2009 Summer Universiade
Athletes (track and field) at the 2009 Mediterranean Games
Mediterranean Games competitors for Serbia
Radford University alumni